John Cale is a Welsh musician, composer and record producer. Although his main field is music (he composed original musical score for many films), he starred in several films as an actor. It began in the sixties with appearances in various experimental films and documentaries (mostly by Andy Warhol, but also by other directors). In 1987, he received lessons from an actor F. Murray Abraham and subsequently played the role of a character named Hubbley in the short film The Houseguest. He later starred in several other films and television series. As a composer, he composes mainly for French drama films. He also participated in a variety of documentary films and television programs. As a director he made one experimental film called Police Car.

Films

As actor

As composer

Documentary appearances

References

External links
 

Male actor filmographies
British filmographies
Filmography